This is a list of licensed Risk game boards.

English releases

Risk

Castle Risk

Risk 40th Anniversary Edition

Risk: 2210 A.D.

Risk: The Lord of the Rings

Risk: The Lord of the Rings: Gondor & Mordor Expansion Set

Risk: Lord of the Rings Trilogy Edition

Risk Godstorm

Risk: Star Wars: Clone Wars Edition

Risk: Star Wars Original Trilogy Edition

Risk: The Transformers Edition

Risk Junior: Narnia

Risk: Halo Wars

Risk Legacy

Risk: Metal Gear Solid

Risk: Starcraft

Risk: Plants vs. Zombies (2013)

A mob of fun-dead zombies are invading the quaint town of Brainsborough, while the pea-packing plants branch out for a battle of suburban domination!

Risk: Plants vs. Zombies is a two-player-only version of the decades-old Risk game, with one player controlling the plants of the wildly successful Plants vs. Zombies digital game and the other controlling the zombies. The game features a double-sided game board and three play modes: mission objectives, tower defense, and total domination.

Risk Europe
Risk Europe differs markedly from the original game, in that each territory generates a specific income for the player, and the player can purchase new units based on the amount of revenue received. Also, each unit succeeds in its attack if the player hits a specific number or lower during the attack. Another change is a new type of unit known as siege weapons is provided to players. Also players have different types of units, each with their own types of tactics and attacks.

French releases

La Conquête du monde† 

† Although not technically a licensed Risk variation, La Conquête du monde is included in this list as it is the precursor to the popular English version of Risk.
4. Le jeu mondial de stategie 1970-1976 Marque et module deposes. Tous droits reserves. plastic armies, wooden dice

Risk: Édition Napoléon

Risk: Édition Napoléon: Extension Empire Ottoman

Brazilian releases

WAR 
Released by Grow in 1972. A few other Brazilian modified versions were released:
 WAR•II (1981), featuring air strikes and new rules for trading cards and armies.
 WAR: Star Wars Episode I (1999), which uses the original rules in the Star Wars universe.
 WAR Júnior (2000), with simplified rules, no territory cards and an alternative attack system by missiles.
 WAR: Império Romano (Roman Empire, 2007), which uses the original rules in a map of the Roman Empire around year 140 CE. Suited for 4 players only.
 WAR: Batalhas Mitológicas (Mythological Battles, 2012), featuring a map of Ancient Greece and an alternative rule set (in addition to the original), which includes mythological beings, 8-sided dice, temples which grant devotion tokens used to evoke the powers of the gods (Ares, Athena, Hades, Poseidon and Zeus) and different rules for trading cards and armies. Suited for 4 players. This is the only version with army pieces in different shapes for different players: centaurs (white), cyclopes (yellow), harpies (green) and minotaurs (black).
 WAR: Vikings (2017), featuring a map of Northern Europe (Scandinavia, Germany, Iceland and British Isles) and advanced rules (in addition to the classic rule), including new commander and Viking ship miniatures, command cards that change every battle involving the commanders, harbors and new rules for blocking sea routes and sea combat. The main addition is a Valhalla side board, where defeated armies go to, and a 'burnout' system that eliminates these armies for the rest of play in order to evoke the powers of Norse gods (Thor, Loki, Freya, Odin and Hel), which change in every combat. Suited for 4 players. This is the first version whose board map has less territories: 36 instead of the usual 42. This fact, allied to the "burnout" system, allows 2-player matches without the use of any "neutral army" rules, besides reducing play time as a whole.

References

Lists of games
Risk (game)